Daniel Lash Marsh (April 12, 1880 – May 20, 1968) was president of Boston University from 1926 to 1951.

Biography
Marsh was raised in Pennsylvania. He became a Methodist preacher before going to study at Northwestern University, where he got an undergraduate degree in 1906 and a master's degree in 1907. He later also studied at Garrett Biblical Institute and Boston University School of Theology.

As president of Boston University, Marsh oversaw the building of a new campus, the merger of Sargent College into the university, and the founding of the School of Social Work the School of Nursing, the School of Public Relations (now the College of Communication), and the General College.

Marsh was a strong proponent of prohibition and advocated for its retention in the 1920s.  He was also not a fan of New York (much preferring Boston), so much so that his comments on the city once caused New York Mayor Jimmy Walker to hold a press conference to condemn them.

Marsh Chapel is named after him.

References

Sources
Boston University bio of Marsh

Healea, Christopher Daryl, “The Builder and Maker of the Greater University: A History of Daniel L. Marsh’s Presidency at Boston University, 1926–1951” (Boston University, 2011). Order No. DA3463124.

External links
 

1880 births
American Methodist clergy
Northwestern University alumni
Boston University School of Theology alumni
Presidents of Boston University
1968 deaths
People from Pennsylvania
20th-century American academics